El Ancasti is a local daily newspaper published in San Fernando del Valle de Catamarca, Argentina.

El Ancasti was founded on July 8, 1988, and like the town of the same name, was named for a Cácan term referring to the Andes that dominate Catamarca Province.

El Ancasti became Catamarca's leading news daily, eclipsing La Unión, established in 1928. The newspaper would later maintain a conflicted relationship with Governor Arnoldo Castillo and his son and successor, Oscar Castillo, whose administrations initiated numerous lawsuits against the daily and withdrew advertising.

References

External links
Online edition

1948 establishments in Argentina
Daily newspapers published in Argentina
Publications established in 1988
Spanish-language newspapers